Clea broti is a Southeast Asian species of freshwater snail with an operculum, an aquatic gastropod mollusk in the family Buccinidae, the true whelks, most of which are marine.

Distribution 
Clea broti occurs in the Mekong River in the Khong District, Champasak Province in southern Laos and in Kas Lognieu, Sambor, and Sandan in Cambodia.

Feeding habits 
Like all snails in the clade Neogastropoda, this species is carnivorous. It feeds on different types of worms and gastropods, often eating other, larger snails after burying themselves and ambushing their prey.

Reproduction  
Clea broti consists of defined male and female genders, and is not capable of gender change. It is unknown as to how to sex these animals. Both males and females seem to be the same size and shape. When a male and female mate, they lock together for 8–12 hours.

References

Buccinidae
Gastropods described in 1876
Taxobox binomials not recognized by IUCN